Kalathodu is a residential area situated in the City of Thrissur in Kerala state of India. Kalathodu is Ward 20 of Thrissur Municipal Corporation.

See also
Thrissur
Thrissur District
List of Thrissur Corporation wards

References

Suburbs of Thrissur city